SCICT is the main council in Iran for ICT affairs. SCICT is managed by Nasrollah Jahangard.

The first form of ICT in Iran was the fax in 1988, and then the computer. Now Iran itself develops ICT. Iranian universities are connected to a gigabit ethernet backbone. Computers have not yet reached all people in Iran. As of 2005, most of the Internet connections are dial-up, but faster ADSL connections are becoming more popular.

See also
Takfa
Communications in Iran
Virastyar

External links
Supreme Council of ICT

Government of the Islamic Republic of Iran